This is the full discography of American songwriter and record producer Nicholas Furlong, also known as RAS.

Discography

Singles

As The Dirty Rich

As featured vocalist

Production and songwriting credits

References 

Discographies of American artists
Production discographies